Events that occurred during the year 1624 in Sweden, including births and deaths.

Incumbents
 Monarch – Gustaf II Adolf

Events

April 

 April 15: The city of Sala is granted town privileges by Gustaf II Adolf.

June 

 1 June: The truce between Sweden and Poland expires, but is extended until March 1, 1625.

September 

 September 11: The royal secretary Göran Bähr is hung for his apostasy of the protestant religion.
 September 21: Södertälje 's mayor Z. Anthelius, and two other Swedes are executed because of their Catholic faith.

Births

 February 13: Erik Oxenstierna (not to be confounded with Eric Oxenstierna), born in Södermanland, count of Södermöre and swedish chancellor. 
 29 June - Olov Svebilius, archbishop from 1681 to his death in 1700.
 unknown date - Anna Eriksdotter,  alleged witch (died 1704).
 Maria Dauerer, pharmacist (apothecary) (died 1688).

Deaths
 March 25: Lucretia Magnusdotter (Gyllenhielm), illegitimate royal daughter (died 1562).

References 

 
Years of the 17th century in Sweden
Sweden